Love Games (also known as Love Games: Love Dangerously) is a 2016 Indian erotic thriller film directed by Vikram Bhatt and produced by Mukesh Bhatt, Mahesh Bhatt and Bhushan Kumar. The film stars Patralekha, Gaurav Arora and Tara Alisha Berry in the main cast. It was released on 8 April 2016.

Plot
Ramona Raichand (Patralekha) is an edgy and adventurous woman. Thrill and lust are all she wants in life, and Sam (Gaurav Arora) is her boy-toy. Sam is perpetually depressed and resorts to self-harm for a temporary relief. He tells his psychiatrist (Rukhsar Rehman) that something was missing in his life, the void of some missing piece in his life, makes him feel no pain, emotionally. Here, he also says, that he believes love is nothing but an excuse of lust. We also get to know that his mother, who had fled with another man, despite loving his father, had done a love-marriage with his father. Thus, he believes all love stories have a tragic ending.

His friend, Ramona tells him that he does not believe in love, because he has not seen adventures in the way of finding love.

So, the closet couple decides to take their escapades a notch higher by playing Love Games. As per the rules of the game, Ramona and Sam need to find the happiest couple in a page 3 party and then seduce one of them to bed. They meet a successful criminal lawyer Gaurav Asthana (Hiten Tejwani) and his surgeon wife Alisha (Tara Alisha Berry). The wife's vulnerability against her abusive husband only helps Ramona and Sam's plan. However things do not remain a game any more when Sam eventually falls in deep love for Alisha. Ramona's vicious mind isn't willing to let go of Sam, and their relationship becomes sour. Ramona's obsession takes the center stage and Sam becomes the victim.

Cast
 Patralekha as Ramona Raichand
 Gaurav Arora as Sameer Saxena (Sam)
 Tara Alisha Berry as Alisha Asthana
 Hiten Tejwani as Gaurav Asthana
 Alisha Farrer as Sonia Kamat
 Rukhsar Rehman as Sameer's psychiatrist

Production

Marketing
The trailer and first poster of the film was released on 2 March 2016. The trailer had over a million views on YouTube in few days.

Soundtrack

The first song titled "Awargi" was released on 5 March 2016 where as the complete soundtrack consisting of seven tracks was released on 8 March 2016 under T-Series. It also had English songs. It was composed by Sangeet-Siddharth and the lyrics were given by Kausar Munir and Vikram Bhatt.

Release
The film was released on 8 April 2016 under the production banner of Vishesh Films and was distributed by T-Series and Yash Raj Films in cinemas across India.

Reception

The film mostly gained negative reviews from critics. Mohar Basu of Times of India gave the film 2.5 out of 5. He said: "Vikram Bhatt's Love Games tries to be a tempestuous tale about temptations. But his bright concept is far from being well-fleshed out. There were a bunch of interesting ideas which never intertwine with the narrative."
Sarita A Tanwar of DNA India said that If you love games, stay away. After watching this one, you wouldn't come close to even board games. She rated the film 1 out of 2. Zee News rated the film with 2.5 stars out of 5. Saibal Chatterjee from NDTV Movies said "Love Games is a Vishesh Films offering. So it does not lack surface gloss. But it simply isn't enough to hide its lack of depth. Best avoided" He rated the film with one and a half star out of five. Shubhra Gupta of The Indian Express gave a half star to the film.

References

External links

T-Series (company) films
2016 films
Indian erotic thriller films
Films about adultery in India
Films directed by Vikram Bhatt